The 1956 Round Australia Trial, officially the Mobilgas Trial was the fifth running of the Round Australia Trial. The rally took place between 4 and 19 August 1956. The event covered 13,680 kilometres around Australia. It was won by Eddie Perkins and Lance Perkins, driving a Volkswagen 1200.

Results

References

Rally competitions in Australia
Round Australia Trial